Prof Jonathan Kimetet arap Ng'eno (c.1937 - 12 June 1998) was a Kenyan politician and a member of parliament for Bureti Constituency in Kericho County. He served in different parliament sittings for three terms; two consecutive and one different term.

Political career 
Prof Ng'eno was first elected into parliament in 1979 election on a KANU ticket. He was re-elected in 1983 snap election on a KANU ticket. In 1988 General Election he lost to Timothy Kipkoech Arap Mibey a lawyer from Bureti. He bounced back to parliament in the General Election of 1992 through a KANU ticket again.

Speaker 
He served as Speaker of the National Assembly of Kenya from 1991 when Moses Keino resigned and when Prof. Ng'eno  was re-elected to parliament he then again was elected to serve as a speaker from 1992 to 1993.

Ministerial Position 
He served as the Minister for Public Works and Housing from 1992 to 1997.He had earlier served as a Minister for Education taking over from Dr. Taaitta Toweett who is perceived to have been the best Education Minister that Kenya has ever had. Bureti Constituency held the Ministry of Education leadership for a record of 16 years.

Board Position 
He was appointed to the position of Board Chairperson of National Water Conservation and Pipeline Corporation in 1989.

Death 
Ng'eno died at Nairobi Hospital, ICU on 12 June 1998.

References 

Year of birth unknown
1998 deaths
Members of the National Assembly (Kenya)
Speakers of the National Assembly of Kenya
Government ministers of Kenya
Kenya African National Union politicians
1937 births